Vələver (also, Valaver) is a village and municipality in the Ordubad District of Nakhchivan, Azerbaijan. It is located 27 km in the north-east from the district center, on the slope of the Zangezur ridge. Its population is busy with gardening, vegetable-growing and animal husbandry. There are secondary school, library, club and a medical center in the village. It has a population of 468.

Etymology
The name of the village made out from the components of the Turkic words of vələ (hilly) and ver (upper, top) means "the hilly place, altitude".

References

External links 

Populated places in Ordubad District